Donald Mark Sibley (born ) is a retired American basketball player. He was a 6'2" 175 lb guard and attended Northwestern University. He was selected in the fourth round of the 1973 NBA Draft by the Chicago Bulls but was waived prior to the start of the 1973-74 season. He was the only rookie of 17 in Bulls camp to have graduated from college. He played one year for the Portland Trail Blazers, followed by one year of basketball for a team in Brugges, Belgium. He returned to Northwestern University to earn a Master of Arts in Teaching degree which led to a 33-year career of teaching English and coaching basketball and soccer at York High School in Elmhurst.

Notes

External links
NBA stats @ basketballreference.com

1950 births
Living people
Basketball players from Illinois
Chicago Bulls draft picks
Northwestern Wildcats men's basketball players
Point guards
Portland Trail Blazers players
American men's basketball players